Aodan is the name of three reservoirs in Afghanistan on the road from Khulm (Tashkurgan) to Kunduz, and another one on the road from Kunduz to Hazrat Imam. Taken as a whole, these reservoirs had been the only water available between Kunduz and the Hazrat Imam.

References

Reservoirs in Afghanistan